Dirty Deeds may refer to:
Dirty Deeds (2002 film), starring Bryan Brown and Toni Collette
Dirty Deeds (2005 film), starring Milo Ventimiglia and Lacey Chabert
Dirty Deeds, a book in the Hardy Boys series

See also
Dirty Deeds Done Dirt Cheap, a 1976 album by AC/DC
"Dirty Deeds Done Dirt Cheap" (song), a 1976 song by AC/DC, covered by Joan Jett